Bernardo Víctor Cruz Torres (born 17 July 1993), known simply as Bernardo, is a Spanish footballer who plays for Córdoba CF as a central defender.

Club career
Born in Córdoba, Andalusia, Bernardo finished his development at local club Córdoba CF, making his senior debut with their reserves in 2010–11. He first played an official match for the first team on 6 September 2011, when he came on as second-half substitute in a 1–0 away win against Real Murcia in the second round of the Copa del Rey. His maiden Segunda División appearance came two years later, in a 3–1 home victory over CD Numancia.

On 15 July 2014, after contributing 15 games in a promotion to La Liga, Bernardo joined Racing de Santander on loan. After that spell, he terminated his contract with Córdoba and signed with another reserve team, Sevilla Atlético of Segunda División B.

Bernardo was an undisputed starter during his two-year spell, winning promotion in his first season. He scored his first goal as a professional on 1 October 2016, to help his side earn one point at Gimnàstic de Tarragona (1–1).

On 30 June 2017, Bernardo agreed to a two-year contract with CD Lugo. In the 2019 January transfer window, however, he rejoined former Sevilla B coach Diego Martínez at Granada CF, who also competed in the second division.

On 2 September 2019, after appearing rarely as the team achieved promotion, Bernardo was loaned to AD Alcorcón for one year. The following 11 January, he moved to Numancia also of the second tier and in a temporary deal.

Bernardo returned to Córdoba in the summer of 2020, on a free transfer.

Personal life
Bernardo's older brother, Francisco, was also a footballer and a defender. Both were groomed at Córdoba.

References

External links

1993 births
Living people
Spanish footballers
Footballers from Córdoba, Spain
Association football defenders
Segunda División players
Segunda División B players
Tercera División players
Segunda Federación players
Córdoba CF B players
Córdoba CF players
Racing de Santander players
Sevilla Atlético players
CD Lugo players
Granada CF footballers
AD Alcorcón footballers
CD Numancia players